Fenton is both a surname and a male given-name originating, literally-meaning "fen/marsh town", is the name of several English places, popular in the United States and New Zealand.  It is also a name of Irish-Gaelic origin; Ó Fionnachta (see Finnerty) or Ó Fiachna 'descendant of Fiachna', an old personal name Anglicized as Feighney and sometimes mistranslated as 'Hunt' (see Fee).  Notable people with the name include:

People with the surname Fenton

Actors and actresses 
 Lavinia Fenton (1708-1760)
 Leonard Fenton (1926-2022)
 Simon Fenton

Fictional characters 
 Fenton, a 'young gentleman' in Shakespeare's The Merry Wives of Windsor
 Harry Fenton, character in Peaky Blinders
 Lord Fenton, character in Scarlett
 Fenton Crackshell, aka GizmoDuck from DuckTales
 Fenton, the Death Sheep from Hell, the subject of the song "Sheep Marketing Ploy" by Tom Smith
 Fenton Mewley, character from the animated TV show Home Movies
 Fenton Hardy from the Hardy Boys books
 Fenton O'Connell, an alias of Kevin Ryan from Castle
 Fenton Meiks, character in Frailty
 Fenton, a minor character that has a feud with Fez in That '70s Show
 Daniel Fenton, main character of Danny Phantom
 Harcourt Fenton ("Harry") Mudd, character from Star Trek (Original Series) episodes "Mudd's Women" and "I, Mudd."  In "I, Mudd" his full name was voiced (in derision) by a replica of his long-abandoned wife, Stella, who accused him of assorted 'crimes:'  "Harcourt Fenton Mudd – have you been drinking?"  He also appeared in the animated episode "Mudd's Passion".

Journalists 
 Anthony Fenton
 Tom Fenton

Musicians 
 Carl Fenton
 George Fenton
 Julian Fenton
 Paul Fenton
 Shane Fenton, singer aka Alvin Stardust

Politicians 
 Bob Fenton (1923–2013), New Zealand politician
 Darien Fenton (born 1954), New Zealand politician
 Donovan Fenton, American politician from New Hampshire
 Ivor D. Fenton (1889–1986), American politician from Pennsylvania
 James Fenton (1864–1950), Australian politician
 Joseph S. Fenton (1781–1851), American politician from Michigan
 Kelly Fenton (born 1966), American politician from Minnesota
 Reuben Fenton (1819–1885), American politician from New York
 William M. Fenton (1808–1871), American politician from Michigan

Sportspersons 
Billy Fenton
Darin Fenton, Canadian curler
Ewan Fenton, Scottish footballer
Georgia-Mae Fenton (born 2000), British artistic gymnast
Geraldine Fenton
Isaac Fenton (1910–1997), English footballer
John Fenton
Lorraine Fenton
Nick Fenton
Paul Fenton, American ice hockey player
Peggy Fenton (1927–2013), American baseball player
Rashad Fenton (born 1997), American football player
Ron Fenton (1940–2013), English footballer and manager
Ted Fenton

Writers 
 Elijah Fenton (1683–1730), an English poet, biographer and translator.
 Geoffrey Fenton (c. 1539 – 1608), an English writer
 James Fenton (born 1949), an English poet, journalist and literary critic. He is a former Oxford Professor of Poetry
 James Fenton (born 1931), Ulster Scots writer and poet.

Other 
 Sir Geoffrey Fenton (c. 1539 – 1608), an English writer, Privy Councillor, and Principal Secretary of State in Ireland.

 Carroll Lane Fenton, American geologist, paleontologist, author
 Clyde Fenton, flying doctor
 David Fenton, founder of Fenton Communications
 Edward Fenton (died 1603), navigator
 Frank Fenton (disambiguation)
 H. J. H. Fenton, chemical engineer
 John Charles Fenton, lawyer
 Joseph Fenton, informer killed by the Provisional Irish Republican Army
 Joseph Clifford Fenton, editor of American Ecclesiastical Review (1944–66)
 Mildred Adams Fenton, American geologist, palentolologist, author
 P. W. Fenton, podcaster
 Prudence Fenton, producer
 Richard Fenton, Welsh topographer, poet and writer
 Roger Fenton, photographer
 Steve Fenton, footballer
 Steve Fenton, rugby league player
 Ted Fenton, manager of West Ham United
 Wayne S Fenton, psychiatrist, researcher with National Institute of Mental Health
 William N. Fenton, historian

People with the given name Fenton 
 Fenton Johnson (1888–1958), American poet, essayist, author of short stories, editor and educator
 Fenton Keogh, celebrity chef
 Fenton Robinson, blues musician
 Fenton Williams, lighting designer, founder of Filament Productions
Fenton Bailey, filmmaker, television producer

See also
Fenton (disambiguation)

References

English-language surnames
English toponymic surnames